BNT 1 is a Bulgarian-language public television station founded in 1959. It began broadcasting on December 26 the same year. The headquarters are located in Sofia, Bulgaria. BNT 1 is run by the Bulgarian National Television.

History
When it was initially launched, the channel was called simply Bulgarian Television (Българска телевизия), as it was the only channel available. When a second state-owned channel was started in 1974, it was renamed to First Programme (Първа програма), and later to "BT 1" (БТ 1) (with BT still referring to Bulgarian Television).

In 1992, BT 1 and BT 2 were given separate visual designs and were renamed respectively to Channel 1 (Канал 1) and Efir 2 (Ефир 2). In this period, the channel was also referred to as BNT Channel 1 (Канал 1 на БНТ), to show that it was operated by the BNT.

On 14 September 2008 BNT Channel 1 changed its name once more, this time to "BNT 1" in an effort to put all BNT channels under a single banner (e.g., the Plovdiv TV Channel will become BNT Plovdiv). The second BNT channel called BNT 2 broadcasts the local programming of the former four regional TV centres, and broadcasts nationally.

It airs sports like the UEFA Europa League–2021 along with bTV Action and RING.  BNT 1, along with its sister channel BNT 2 and the sports channel BNT 3 holds the rights for the Euros and the Olympics.

Logos and identities

Current programming

Panorama (Панорама)
Around the World and at Home (По света и у нас, in Bulgarian)- regular news programme
BNT Taxi (БНТ такси)
A Minute is Too Much (Минута е много) - game show
The Day Begins (Денят започва) - morning news and discussion block
The Memory of Bulgaria (Памет българска) - history programme
The Big Choice (Големият избор) - reality show, which aims to "find the new leader of Bulgaria"
Faith and Society (Вяра и общество) - programme about religion in Bulgaria
HAH XAX - afternoon show for teens
Night Owls (Нощни птици) - late-night talk show, featuring well-known persons from Bulgaria and around the world
Everwood
ER
The Black Adder
The Bold and the Beautiful
One Tree Hill (TV series)
My Family
Hannah Montana
Wizards of Waverly Place
JONAS (title translated as "Jonas Brothers")
Totally Spies (from Canal France International)
Mickey Mouse Clubhouse
My Friends Tigger & Pooh
Private Practice
Falling Skies
Sailor Moon
Barbapapa
Trotro
LazyTown
The Flintstones
DuckTales
Chip 'n Dale: Rescue Rangers
Timon & Pumbaa
Sagwa, the Chinese Siamese Cat
Aladdin
House of Mouse
Magical DoReMi
Darkwing Duck
The New Adventures of Winnie the Pooh
The Little Mermaid
Lilo & Stitch: The Series
Vipo: Adventures of the Flying Dog
Masha and the Bear
The Mézga Family
Phineas and Ferb
Kim Possible
Teenage Mutant Ninja Turtles
Make Way for Noddy
Kikoriki
Pink Panther (1993)
Spiff and Hercules
Goof Troop
Dinosaur Train
Pajanimals
Zoom the White Dolphin

Upcoming programming
Belle and Sebastian
Clifford the Big Red Dog 
Alma's Way
Molly of Denali

References

Television networks in Bulgaria
Bulgarian-language television stations
Television channels and stations established in 1959
Mass media in Sofia